Cameron Wheatley (born 16 April 1992) is an Australian cricketer. He made his first-class debut for Cricket Australia XI during Pakistan's tour of Australia on 8 December 2016. He opened the bowling on his first-class debut finishing with figures of 2/63 for the match. During the second innings of his first-class debut, he was given out caught at slip, after edging the ball to former Pakistan cricket captain Younis Khan. Wheatley was named in Tasmania's 13-man squad for their pink ball, 2015–16 Sheffield Shield season match against Queensland. Wheatley earned a full state contract for the Tasmanian Tigers for the 2016–17 season. He played Tasmanian Grade Cricket for Kingborough Cricket Club.

References

External links
 

1992 births
Living people
Australian cricketers
Cricket Australia XI cricketers
Place of birth missing (living people)